Ravi Shankar (1920–2012) was an Indian musician and sitar virtuoso.

Ravi Shankar may also refer to:

 Ravi (music director) (1926–2012), Ravi and Sharma, Indian film score composer
 Ravi Shankar (spiritual leader) (born 1956), Indian spiritual leader
 Ravi Shankar (poet) (born 1975), former faculty member of Central Connecticut State University
 Ravisankar, South Indian playback singer
 P. Ravi Shankar (born 1966), Indian actor and dubbing artist
 Ravi Shankar Prasad (born 1954), Indian Minister of Communications and Information Technology
 Ravi Shankar (cartoonist), Indian author and cartoonist